UFC Fight Night: Teixeira vs. Bader (also known as UFC Fight Night 28) was a mixed martial arts that was held on September 4, 2013, at Mineirinho Arena in Belo Horizonte, Brazil.

Background
A bout between Raphael Assunção and T.J. Dillashaw was briefly linked to this event.  However, the pairing was delayed and will take place at a later event this year due to a minor medical issue for Assunção.

Godofredo Pepey was expected to face Sam Sicilia at the event.  However, Pepey pulled out of the bout citing an injury and was replaced by Felipe Arantes.  Then, on August 7, Sicilia also pulled out and was replaced by promotional newcomer Kevin Souza, the former Jungle Fight featherweight champion.

Kenny Robertson was expected to face João Zeferino at this event. However, Robertson pulled out of the bout citing an injury and was replaced by UFC promotional newcomer Elias Silvério, the former Jungle Fight welterweight champion.

Johnny Bedford was expected to face Hugo Viana at this event. However, Bedford pulled out of the bout citing an injury. Viana was then briefly scheduled to face UFC newcomer Wilson Reis.  Then just days before the event, Viana also pulled out of the bout citing an injury and the bout was cancelled.

Marcelo Guimarães was expected to face Keith Wisniewski at this event. However, Guimarães pulled out of the bout citing an injury and was replaced by UFC promotional newcomer Ivan Jorge, the former Jungle Fight lightweight champion.

Results

Bonus awards
The following fighters were awarded $50,000 bonuses.

Fight of the Night: Rafael Natal vs. Tor Troeng
Knockout of the Night: Glover Teixeira
Submission of the Night: Piotr Hallmann

See also
List of UFC events
2013 in UFC

References

UFC Fight Night
2013 in mixed martial arts
Mixed martial arts in Brazil
Sport in Belo Horizonte
2013 in Brazilian sport